Davos Platz railway station is a railway station in the municipality of Davos in the district of Prattigau/Davos in the Swiss canton of Graubünden.

It is the terminus of the Landquart–Davos Platz railway and the Davos Platz–Filisur railway. Northbound, there is an hourly service towards Landquart. Southbound, there is an hourly service to Filisur. The station also serves as a hub for local bus services. Davos Dorf station is located about 2.5 km northeast of Davos Platz.

RE2 runs express services along the Landquart-Davos line. R21 runs stopping services along the same line replacing RE2 services during early mornings and late evenings.

The station currently has three platforms in use.

The lower station of the funicular Schatzalp-Bahn is located nearby.

Services
The following services stop at Davos Platz:

 Regio:
 limited service to Landquart.

References

External links
 
 
 

Railway stations in Switzerland opened in 1890
Railway stations in Graubünden
Rhaetian Railway stations
Davos